Kumma or Semna East is an archaeological site in Sudan. Established in the mid-12th Dynasty of Egypt, it served as a fortress of ancient Egypt in Nubia. Along with Semna, Kumma was built by the Pharaoh Sesostris III (1878 BC – 1839 BC). The forts protected the border between ancient Egypt and the southern areas.

Semna is located on the other side. Both locations are flooded today because of the Aswan High Dam on Lake Nubia. The salvaged temple of Khnum is rebuilt in the National Museum of Sudan at Khartoum.

References
 Dows Dunham, Jozef M. A. Janssen: Second Cataract Forts. Volume 1: Semna, Kumma. Museum of Fine Arts, Boston 1960.
 Fritz Hintze, Walter F. Reineke: Felsinschriften aus dem Sudanesischen Nubien. 2 Bände (Texte und Tafeln). Akademie-Verlag, Berlin 1989, S. 98–102 (Publikation der Nubien-Expedition 1961–1963).
 Stephan Johannes Seidlmayer: Historische und moderne Nilstände. Untersuchungen zu den Pegelablesungen des Nils von der Frühzeit bis zur Gegenwart. Achet, Berlin 2001, S. 73–80 (Achet – Schriften zur Ägyptologie A, 1).

Archaeological sites in Sudan
Nubia